Joseph Ford Hinson (31 August 1919 – 15 May 1989) was an Australian rules footballer who played with Richmond in the Victorian Football League (VFL).

Military service
He enlisted in the Second AIF on 3 July 1942; and, while serving overseas, he lost the sight in one eye.

Notes

References
 Hogan P: The Tigers Of Old, Richmond FC, (Melbourne), 1996. 
 
 World War Two Nominal Roll: Private Joseph Ford Hinson (V504095), Department of Veterans' Affairs.
 B884, V504095: World War Two Service Record: Private Joseph Ford Hinson (V504095), National Archives of Australia.

External links 
 
 
 Joe Hinson, at The VFA Project.

1919 births
1989 deaths
Australian rules footballers from Victoria (Australia)
Richmond Football Club players
Australian Army personnel of World War II
Australian Army soldiers
Australian disabled sportspeople